The Conscientious Objector is a 2004 documentary film about the life of Desmond Doss, a conscientious objector who received a Medal of Honor for his service in World War II. Due to his religious convictions as a Seventh-day Adventist, he refused to carry a weapon. He initially faced opposition, persecution, and ridicule from his fellow soldiers but ultimately won their admiration by demonstrating courage and saving lives as a combat medic.

In 2016, a Mel Gibson film dramatizing Doss's life, Hacksaw Ridge, with Andrew Garfield as Doss, was released to mostly critical and commercial success. It also  signaled Gibson's welcome-back to Hollywood.

Reception

The film has received some positive acclaim.

The film has won multiple awards, including:

 Long Island International Film Expo Festival Prize—Best Feature Film
 Santa Cruz Film Festival Audience Award—Best Documentary
 Heartland Film Festival Crystal Heart Award—Best Director
 Cinequest Film Festival Audience Choice Award
 Cinequest Film Festival Director's Award

References

External links
 
 The Conscientious Objector at the Christian Film Database
 
 

2004 films
Documentary films about veterans
Conscientious objection
Documentary films about World War II
2000s English-language films